The 1958–59 season was Real Madrid Club de Fútbol's 56th season in existence and the club's 28th consecutive season in the top flight of Spanish football.

Summary
During the summer Hungarian player Ferenc Puskás arrived to the club after a two-year FIFA ban on him due to his defection from communist Hungary. The move was controversial due to the player's age (31 years old) and him allegedly being overweight, the reasons why he had been already turned down by Juventus, Milan, and Manchester United.

However, Puskas and Di Stefano completed a lethal duo with an astonishing campaign collecting the club's fourth consecutive European Cup, defeating Just Fontaine's Stade de Reims. However, Puskas missed the final match due to a technical decision by head coach Luis Carniglia, who was fired after that by club chairman Santiago Bernabéu. Additionally, Di Stefano clinched another top scorer individual trophy in the Spanish league with 23 goals. Puskas was second with 21 goals.

The squad finished in a decent second spot in the league standings, four points behind champions Barcelona, despite scoring a club record 89 goals (to Barcelona's 96). In June, Real Madrid reached the semi-finals of Copa del Generalísimo, where they were defeated by Barcelona.

Squad

Transfers

Competitions

La Liga

League table

Position by round

Matches

Copa del Generalísimo

Round of 32

Round of 16

Quarter-finals

Semi-finals

European Cup

First round

Quarter-finals

Semi-finals

Final

Statistics

Squad statistics

Players statistics

Notes

References

Real Madrid CF seasons
Real Madrid CF
UEFA Champions League-winning seasons